The 2021–22 Rahmatganj MFS's season was the 89th competitive highest level season. In addition to domestic league, Rahmatganj MFS are participating on this season's edition of Federation Cup and Independence Cup. The season cover period was 1 October 2021 to August 2.

Season summary

December
On 3 December 2021, Rahmatganj began their season with a 2–3 loss against newly promoted side Swadhinata KS, in the first match of the  2021–22 Independence Cup. Philip Adjah gave Rahmatganj MFS the lead within 3 minutes, however, in the 16th minute the score was leveled by Rafał Zaborowski. In the 25 minute a goal by Sanowar Hossain, had Rahmatganj MFS finish first-half with score 2–1. In the second half scored level by Swadhinata KS Nedo Turković on 50 minutes. On 80 minutes own goal by Mohammad Al-Amin gave lead 3–2 and Swadhinata KS ensured win.

On 7 December Rahmatganj MFS were defeated 3–1 by Dhaka Abahani. On 14 minutes thanks to an own goal by Dhaka Abahani's Tutul Hossain Badsha, Rahmatganj MFS took lead, but after 4 minutes Brazilian forward Dorielton equalized the score. In the second half on 50 minutes a penalty goal by Raphael Augusto and 70 minutes penalty goal by Dorielton ended the game 3–1, resulting in the club being eliminated from the Independence Cup

On 28 December Rahmatganj MFS began their 2021–22 Federation Cup campaign with a 3–0 win against Muktijoddha Sangsad KC by FIFA Walkover laws. The match scheduled to be played scheduled date but Muktijoddha withdrew their name from the tournament. As per FIFA Walkover laws opposition club declared the winner of the match.

On 30 December Rahmatganj MFS drew 1–1 against Sheikh Jamal DC. On 7 minutes Nurul Absar goal took lead Sheikh Jamal DC and they have finished first half with lead. In the second half additional time 90+1 minutes goal by Sajidur Rahman Sajid equal the scored. Due to Muktijoddha Sangsad KC withdrawal, both teams points were equal in the group stage and referee were used penalty shoot out to the determined group champion which Sheikh Jamal DC won 5–0 goals.

January
On 3 January Rahmatganj MFS lost 3–4 goals versus Sheikh Russel KC. In the first half Rahmatganj MFS Philip Adjah two goals on 28, 45 minutes finished first half with score 2–0. In the second half fought back Sheikh Russel KC Thiago Amaral score on 63 minutes made scored  2–1. In the 82 minutes Aizar Akmatov penalty goal and Ailton Machado on 84 minutes made the score 3–2. In the 89 minutes Rahmatganj Nigerian Sunday Chizoba level the scoreline 3–3. In the extra time on 118 minutes goal by Khondoker Ashraful Islam secured Rahmatganj MFS Semi-finals place. 

On 6 January  Rahmatganj MFS won 2–1 against Dhaka Mohammedan in their 1st Semi-finals of Federation Cup. On 5 minutes Rajib Hossain gave lead to Dhaka Mohammedan until end half time. In the second half on 67 minutes,  Philip Adjah equalised for Rahmatganj and level score 1–1 and in the additional time (90+1 minutes), after Adjah outpaced Sadekujaman Fahim, Sunday Chizoba secured Final ticket for Rahmatganj MFS.

On 9 January Rahmatganj MFS lost 2–1 goals against Dhaka Abahani in the final of the Federation Cup Bangladesh. In the first half both clubs play excellent but they wouldn't get goals until scored Dainiel Colindres on 45+1 minutes. In the second half Rakib Hossain extended the score 2–0. On 70 minutes Philip Adjah goal made scoreline 2–1 and Rahmatganj MFS finished their tournament journey will runner up trophy and Dhaka Abahani grabbed 12th Federation Cup trophy.

February
On 5 February 2022, Rahmatganj began their 2021–22 Bangladesh Premier League season with a 2–1 defeat to Chittagong Abahani.In the first half within 4 minutes, a goal by Philip Adjah helped Rahmatganj take the lead and, finished the first half with 1–0 lead. But in the second half Peter Ebimobowei goal on 52 minutes leveled the score 1–1. On 72 minutes a goal by Rubel Miya headed Chittagong Abahani into the lead, making the score 2–1. In the end, the Rahmatganj MFS players kept on attacking to find the equalizer, however, they could not succeed in salvaging a point.

On 9 February Rahmatganj MFS has meet their home game versus Saif Sporting Club and lost by 1–3 goals. In the first half on 16 minutes a goal by Foysal Ahmed Fahim and on 40 minutes a goal by Nigerian Emeka Ogbugh took lead before ended of half time. In the second half on 66 minutes a goal by Maraz Hossain Saif SC made the scoreline 0–3. After conceded 3 goals Rahmatganj MFS playing attacking football and on 71 minutes a goal scored by Nigerian forward Sunday Chizoba made score  1–3 until finished the game.

On 13 February Rahmatganj MFS lost by 0–3 goals in away match against Dhaka Abahani. In the first half on 40, 43 and 45+1 minutes hat trick goals by Dorielton took lead with 3–0. In the second half Rahamtganj MFS tried to fought back but Dhaka Abahani players kept them in check to avoid any score. Dhaka Abahani left the field with full three points.

On 17 February Rahmatganj MFS drew 3–3 against Sheikh Jamal DC at home. In the first half on 23 minutes Gambian forward Solomon King Kanform goal took lead and his second goals on 43 minutes finished halftime with lead 2–0. In the second half on 68 minutes Tajikistan forward Siyovush Asrorov goal made scoreline 2–1. Afternoon 6 minutes a goal by Mohammed Atikuzzaman lead the score 3–1 but the lead was retained till 89 minutes before score Sunday Chizoba on 90 minutes and Lancine Touré on 90+4 minutes. End the match with result 3–3 goals.

On 22 February Rahmatganj MFS defeated to Bashundhara Kings by 3–2 goals in the away match. In the first half Rahmatganj MFS Nigerian forward Sunday Chizoba goal on 28 minutes took the lead Rahmatganj MFS but between 4 minutes Brazilian Robinho equalized scored 1–1. On 44 minutes Mohammad Ibrahim goal gave lead to Basundhara Kings made score 2–1. In the last minutes of half time second penalty goal by Sunday Chizoba on 45+3 minutes finished halftime with 2–2. In the second half on 75 minutes Yeasin Khan goal secured victory for Bashundhara Kings  3–2.

March
On 2 March Rahmatganj MFS have won against Uttar Baridhara Club by 3–1 goals at home ground. In the first half Ghanaian forward Philip Adjah goal on 32 minutes got lead Rahmatganj MFS but on 41 minutes Uttar Baridhara Club Uzbekistan midfielder 
Yevgeniy Kochnev goals leveled the score 1–1 after 2 minutes Philip Adjah again score and make score 2–1 before go to halftime break. In the second half on 73 minutes  Midfielder Md Enamul Islam goal helped to win the game by 3–1 score.

On 7 March Rahmatganj MFS won against Muktijoddha Sangsad KC by 1–0 goals in the away match.

On 12 March Rahmatganj MFS lost by 1–2 goals against Bangladesh Police FC at home stadium.

On 16 March Rahmatganj MFS drew by 1–1 goals against Swadhinata KS at home ground. In the first half both teams played excellent and competitive football and at the end of the first half scoreline was 0–0. In the second half on 56 minutes Ghanaian forward Philip Adjah goal took lead Rahmatganj MFS but the club was not able to defend score for a long Swadhinata KS forward Zilliur Rahman goal on 64 minutes equalized score 1–1 goals. Rest of the time were not score any goals and both are share points.

April
On 4 April Rahmatganj MFS drew against Sheikh Russel KC by 1–1 goals at in the away game. On 4 minutes goal by a goal by Nigerian forward Sunday Chizoba Rahmatganj MFS took early lead but between one minutes goal by Mohammad Jewel Sheikh Russel KC equalized score 1–1 and they have finished first halftime. In the second 45 minutes both teams play goalless until end the game.

On 8 April Rahmatganj MFS lost by 1–5 goals against Dhaka Mohammedan at home match.

On 25 April Rahmatganj MFS drew against Chittagong Abahani by 0–0 at home ground.

May
On 7 May Rahmatganj MFS have lost 1–2 goals against Dhaka Abahani at home game.

On 12 May Rahmatganj MFS have lost by 0–1 goal in the away game against Sheikh Jamal DC.

June
On 21 June Rahmatganj MFS have lost against Bashundhara Kings by 0–2 at home ground.

On 27 June Rahmatganj MFS have drew by 1–1 goals versus Uttar Baridhara Club in the away match.

July
On 4 July Rahmatganj MFS have thrashed Muktijoddha Sangsad KC with score 7–1
at home ground.

On 15 July Rahmatganj MFS have drew against Bangladesh Police FC by 0–0 goal in the away game.

On 21 July Rahmatganj MFS have won by 5–1 goals against Swadhinata KS in the away game.

On 27 July Rahmatganj MFS have lost 2–3 goals versus Sheikh Russel KC at home ground.

August
On 2 August Rahmatganj MFS have defeated to Dhaka Mohammedan by 0–7 goals in the away game.

Transfer

In

Current squad

Pre-season friendly

Competitions

Overview

Overview

Independence Cup

Group stages

Group A

Federation Cup

Group stages

Group D

Knockout stage

Premier League

League table

Results summary

Results by round

Matches

Goalscorers

Source: Matches

References

Rahmatganj MFS
Bangladeshi football club records and statistics
Football clubs in Bangladesh
2021 in Bangladeshi football
2022 in Bangladeshi football